Count Nils Bielke (7 February 1644 in Stockholm – 26 November 1716) was a member of the High Council of Sweden, military and politician.

Born the eldest son of Baron Ture Nilsson Bielke, who died in 1648, Queen Christina granted the young boy the barony of Korpo in the archipelago of Finland Proper in 1649. He married countess Eva Horn, one of the heiresses of the sonless field marshal Count Gustav Horn af Björneborg.

Nils Bielke entered the service of the Swedish Army and the Royal Court in the 1660s. He was appointed Lieutenant General in 1678, Governor-General of Swedish Estonia in 1687 and Swedish Pomerania (1687–98). He became Field Marshal in 1690.

During the Scanian War (1675–1679), he made important contributions both as a troop organizer and as an officer on the field. He especially distinguished himself at the Battle of Lund in 1676 as the commander of the Royal Cavalry Guard (Livregementet till häst).

He was Sweden's ambassador in France from 1679–1682 and 1684–1687, he took part in Emperor Leopold I's Great Turkish War. He was created Reichsgraf in the Holy Roman Empire. Charles XI of Sweden later allowed him comital rank in Sweden.

Nils Bielke was dissatisfied with Charles XI's despotic policy towards the old aristocracy. As the governor of Swedish Pomerania it was only reluctantly that he took part in the reduction of property belonging to the nobility. In addition to this, he undertook private negotiations in order to push Sweden towards a pro-French policy against the wishes of the Swedish government.

As a result of this, he lost his position in 1698 and after a long legal process, he was sentenced to death in 1705. He was, however, pardoned and in 1715, he was redeemed.

References

Sources
The article Bielke, Nils in Nationalencyklopedin (1990)

External links

Nils Bielke, Historiesajten 

1644 births
1716 deaths
Politicians from Stockholm
Swedish nobility
Swedish Pomerania
Field marshals of Sweden
17th-century Swedish politicians
Military personnel of the Holy Roman Empire
17th-century Swedish military personnel